Kiyoshi Nishimura (Nishimura Kiyoshi) (September 7, 1932 – November 17, 1993) was a Japanese filmmaker known for his hard-boiled action films and television series.

Education 
During his student days at Tachikawa High School in Tokyo, Nishimura worked part-time at a U.S. military base in Tachikawa and became immersed in filmgoing. In 1956 he graduated from Hitotsubashi University, where he was a classmate of Shintaro Ishihara.

Career 
He subsequently joined Toho and worked as an assistant director to Akira Kurosawa, Mikio Naruse, Ishirō Honda, Yuzō Kawashima, Hirokawa Horimichi, Yasuki Chiba, Eizō Sugawa, Kengo Furusawa and Hideo Onchi. He was promoted to director for the 1969 suspense actioner Shinu ni wa Mada Hayai starring Toshio Kurosawa. His next film Hakuchū no Shūgeki (1970), with Kurosawa again taking the lead role, further established him as one of Toho's most distinctive action directors. He was an aficionado of jazz, which features prominently in the soundtracks of his films, and also an avid diver.

As the Japanese film industry continued to decline, Nishimura left Toho to work freelance, and directed numerous television series. He was highly regarded for his ability to accomplish quality work despite budget and time restrictions.

After his arrest in 1987 for secretly using a video camera in a public bathhouse for women, few companies would hire Nishimura due to the media's heavy coverage of the scandal. For a time, he directed television shows under the pseudonym Yūsai Itō (井藤雄才).

Death 
On November 17, 1993, Nishimura was found drowned on the Hayama coast in Kanagawa. A police investigation concluded that he had committed suicide. He was 61.

Filmography

Director 
 1969 Shinu ni wa Mada Hayai (死ぬにはまだ早い)
 1970 Hakuchū no Shūgeki (白昼の襲撃)
 1970 The Creature Called Man (豹は走った, Jagā wa Hashitta)
 1970 Kigeki: Otoko Urimasu (喜劇　男売ります)
 1971 Sugoi Yatsura (凄い奴ら)
 1972 Hairpin Circus (ヘアピン・サーカス, Heapin Sākasu)
 1972 Bara no Hyōteki (薔薇の標的)
 1973 Yūbae ni Ashita wa Kieta (夕映えに明日は消えた) Unreleased.
 1977 Tree of Youth (青年の樹, Seinen no Ki)
 1978 Melodies of the White Night (白夜の調べ, Byakuya no Shirabe)
 1979 Golden Partners (黄金のパートナー, Ōgon no Pātonā)
 1984 Eve in a Summer Dress (夏服のイヴ, Natsufuku no Ibu)
 1991 Madonna no Fukushū (マドンナの復讐) Straight-to-video film.

External links 
 
 
 Hairpin Circus review at Midnight Eye

References

1932 births
1993 deaths
Japanese filmmakers
People from Tokyo
Hitotsubashi University alumni